The Cinema Organ Society (COS) was founded in 1952 by Hubert Selby and Tony Moss for those interested in organ music as entertainment.  The aim of the society is to preserve and promote the presentation of these wonderful instruments for the enjoyment of existing and future generations.

It is for everyone interested in organ music as entertainment, with the emphasis on the cinema or theatre organ.

The COS is organised into a number of districts around the UK, each with its own 'adopted' cinema organ.

 Northern District Wurlitzer, Victoria Hall, Saltaire.  Originally installed in the Gaumont Cinema, Oldham, Lancashire, 1937. 3 Manuals, 11 Ranks + Midi Piano
 Midlands & Wales District Compton, Hampton-in-Arden, Fentham Hall. Originally installed in the Tower Cinema, West Bromwich. 3 Manuals, 11 Ranks, Melotone, Digital Piano
 Southern District maintains the largest Wurlitzer ever imported to Europe from the US.  Now fully restored and installed in Troxy, East London, it was originally installed in the Trocadero, Elephant & Castle, London. 4 Manuals, 25 Ranks, Piano

See also
Wurlitzers in the United Kingdom
American Theatre Organ Society
Theatre Organ Society International

Notes

External links
The Cinema Organ Society Website

Silent film music
Theatre organ organizations
Organizations established in 1952
1952 establishments in the United Kingdom